The following lists events that happened during 1870 in Chile.

Incumbents
President of Chile: José Joaquín Pérez

Events

May
May - The Chilean Army resumes operations against the Mapuches

Births
date unknown - Francisco Adriano Caro

Deaths
28 March - Candelaria Pérez (b. 1810)

References 

 
1870s in Chile
Chile
Chile
Years of the 19th century in Chile